Rick Duff (born June 21, 1964 in Camrose, Alberta) is a retired boxer from Canada, who competed for his country as a middleweight (– 75 kg) at the 1984 Summer Olympics in Los Angeles, California. He defeated the Australian Brendon Cannon in the first round, but was defeated in the second round of the men's  division by South Korea's eventual gold medalist Shin Joon-Sup.

1984 Canadian Olympic box-offs
The box-offs took place during the 1984 Canadian National Junior Boxing Championships at the British Columbia Amateur Boxing Training Centre in Burnaby, BC, May 25 to 27, where Duff defeated Darrell Flint, and won a spot on the Canadian Olympic Boxing Team.

Duff is currently coaching amateur boxing in Lethbridge, Alberta.

References

External links
 Profile

1964 births
Living people
Middleweight boxers
Boxers at the 1984 Summer Olympics
Olympic boxers of Canada
Sportspeople from Alberta
People from Camrose, Alberta
Canadian male boxers